Laghetto delle Conche is a lake on the island of Elba, Italy. The island is part of the Province of Livorno, Tuscany.

Lakes of Tuscany
Elba